Pelopidas agna, the obscure branded swift or dark branded swift, is a butterfly belonging to the family Hesperiidae found in India.

Description
In 1891, Edward Yerbury Watson wrote:

References

Pelopidas (skipper)
Butterflies of Asia
Butterflies of Indochina
Butterflies described in 1865